Neuvy-en-Champagne is a former commune in the Sarthe department in the region of Pays de la Loire in north-western France. On 1 January 2019, it was merged into the new commune Bernay-Neuvy-en-Champagne.

Geography
The river Vègre forms part of the commune's western border. The village lies on the right bank of the Neuvy, a tributary of the Vègre.

See also
Communes of the Sarthe department

References

Former communes of Sarthe